The Albristhorn (or Albrist) is a mountain in the Bernese Alps, overlooking Lenk and Adelboden in the canton of Bern. It is the highest summit of the chain lying between the Wildstrubel and Lake Thun and which is the watershed between the Simme and the Kander.

The summit is accessible to experienced hikers with a trail starting at Hahnenmoos Pass.

References

External links

Albristhorn on SummitPost

Bernese Alps
Mountains of the Alps
Mountains of the canton of Bern
Mountains of Switzerland
Two-thousanders of Switzerland